Henry Noel Bentinck, 11th Earl of Portland, Count Bentinck und Waldeck Limpurg (2 October 1919 – 30 January 1997) was a British Army officer, peer, and intellectual.

Early life and education
Bentinck was born in the parish of St George Hanover Square, Westminster. His father was Count Robert Charles Bentinck (1875–1932), a descendant of William Bentinck, 1st Count Bentinck (1704–1774), a younger son of William Bentinck, 1st Earl of Portland, and a half-brother of Henry Bentinck, 1st Duke of Portland, died when Bentinck was only twelve. His mother, Lady Norah Ida Emily Noel, eldest daughter of Charles William Francis Noel, 3rd Earl of Gainsborough, and a great-great-granddaughter of William IV, died when he was nineteen. 

He was educated at Harrow and the Royal Military College, Sandhurst, but left after only a term amidst press headlines – "Count missing from Sandhurst". He worked as a cowboy in California for a year, returning to England in 1939 and marrying Pauline Ursula Mellowes in 1940. He registered as a conscientious objector, but after the death of a close friend he joined the Coldstream Guards, as a private soldier. He was soon commissioned as an officer and served with distinction in Italy at Camino. He was wounded twice, and then was a prisoner of war until 1945, when he was able to rejoin his regiment in Trieste.

Career
After the war he was a producer at the BBC. From 1952 to 1955 he worked as a jackaroo on a sheep station in Tasmania.

He rejoined the BBC, as producer of the Today programme presented by Jack de Manio and other series. At this time he wrote his first book, Anyone Can Understand the Atom. In 1959 he joined J. Walter Thompson as an advertising producer, working on over 600 commercials. He created and produced the Nimble bread balloon commercials, as well as the first campaign for Mr Kipling, himself coining the phrase, "Mr Kipling makes exceedingly good cakes".

He moved to Devon in 1974 with his second wife Jenny Hopkins to run a self-sufficient organic smallholding and guest-house for six years. Later he struck up a close friendship with James Lovelock, the creator of the Gaia hypothesis, and published Life is a Sum Humanity Is Doing Wrong.

He died at Little Cudworthy, a house in Dolton, Devon.

Marriages and children
He was married on 13 October 1940 to Pauline Ursula Mellowes (London, 15 October 1921 – Potten End, Hertfordshire, 10 January 1967), daughter of Frank Wilford Mellowes (Sheffield, South Yorkshire, April / June 1875 – London, 10 October 1940) and wife Doris (née Watts). They had three children: 
Lady Sorrel Deidre Bentinck (born 22 February 1942), married Sir John Philip Lister Lister-Kaye, 8th Baronet, and has issue.
Lady Anna Cecilia Bentinck (born 18 May 1947).
Timothy Charles Robert Noel Bentinck, 12th Earl of Portland (born 1 June 1953), an actor known for his long-running role as David Archer in the BBC Radio 4 series The Archers.

He married secondly, Jenifer Hopkins, in 1974. She died in 2016.

Peerages
With the death of his cousin in 1968 he became Count Bentinck of the Holy Roman Empire, a foreign title which may be used in the United Kingdom due to a royal licence of 1886.

In 1990, on the death of his distant cousin the 9th Duke of Portland, he succeeded to the Earldom of Portland through his descent from the first Earl. One of the last generation of hereditary peers to take a seat in the House of Lords by direct inheritance, his maiden speech in the Lords in January 1993 was on the 9th report of the European Communities Committee on the Implementation and Enforcement of Environmental Legislation, when he spoke for restrained urban and population growth on ecological grounds.

References

External links
 
 Tim Bentinck's Memorial site
 "Burke's Peerage and Baronetage"
 "Nederlands Adelsboek"
 http://familytrees.genopro.com/iaintait/Tree_Compilation/genomaps/genomap125.svg

|-
of the Holy Roman Empire

1919 births
1997 deaths
H
Counts of the Holy Roman Empire
Teutonic Knights
People educated at Harrow School
BBC people
British conscientious objectors
Coldstream Guards officers
British Army personnel of World War II
Graduates of the Royal Military College, Sandhurst
Earls of Portland